Cantharis livida is a species of soldier beetle belonging to the genus Cantharis family Cantharidae.

Description
The body of this species is flat and long, with a weak exoskeleton. The colour is quite variable, depending on the subspecies. Elytra are usually yellow or reddish-brown, but in the subspecies rufipes they are black or dark brown. The head, the thorax, the abdomen are bright red or orange. The long antennae are reddish, with darker tips. The legs are reddish, with brownish tarsi.

These soldier beetles can be found  on flowers, trees and shrubs from May to July, hunting for small insects. Also the larvae are predators, feeding on snails and earthworms.

Distribution
This species is present in most of Europe, in the eastern Palearctic realm, and in North Africa. It has also been introduced to the eastern United States and Canada.

Habitat
Cantharis livida lives in bushes, edges of forests and meadows.

Subspecies
 Cantharis livida var. adusta Reitter
 Cantharis livida var. inscapularis Pic, 1909
 Cantharis livida var. luteiceps Schilsky
 Cantharis livida var. melaspis Chevrolat
 Cantharis livida var. menetriesi Faldermann, 1838
 Cantharis livida var. nigripes Schilsky, 1889
 Cantharis livida var. rufipes Herbst, 1784
 Cantharis livida var. scapularis Redtenbacher 1858
 Cantharis livida var. sicula Bourgeois, 1893
 Cantharis livida var. varendorffi Reitter, 1904

References

 Biolib
 Fauna europaea
 NCBI
 Nature Spot

Cantharidae
Beetles of Europe
Beetles described in 1758
Articles containing video clips
Taxa named by Carl Linnaeus